Cowling Arboretum is an arboretum of 800 acres (3.2 km2) adjacent to Carleton College in Northfield, Minnesota. It is located on a natural border between prairie and forest habitat, and in part on the floodplain of the Cannon River, and is open to the public without any fees.

The Arboretum was established by Donald J. Cowling and Harvey E. Stork in the 1920s for education, conservation, and recreation.  It is a Minnesota State Game Refuge, with some 10 miles of trails, and displays both native and non-native trees and shrubs.

See also
 List of botanical gardens in the United States

References

External links
 

Arboreta in Minnesota
Carleton College
Protected areas of Rice County, Minnesota